Ritchie Darryl Owens (born May 22, 1972) is a former American football defensive lineman in the National Football League (NFL) for the Washington Redskins, Miami Dolphins, Kansas City Chiefs and Seattle Seahawks.  He played college football, graduated from Lehigh University and was drafted in the fifth round of the 1995 NFL Draft.

External links
 

1972 births
Living people
American football defensive ends
Washington Redskins players
Miami Dolphins players
Players of American football from Philadelphia
Kansas City Chiefs players
Seattle Seahawks players
Lehigh Mountain Hawks football players